Hanoi Indoor Games Gymnasium or Mỹ Đình Indoor Athletics Arena is an indoor arena in Hanoi, Vietnam. It has a capacity of 3,094 using permanent seating and temporary seating configuration. The arena is a part of Vietnam National Sporting Complex, situated north west of Mỹ Đình National Stadium and Mỹ Đình Aquatics Center.

The venue was one of several projects built to commemorate the Millennial Anniversary of Hanoi. It officially opened on September 19, 2009 after 14 months of construction, in time for the 2009 Asian Indoor Games.

Design
To prepare for the 3rd Asian Indoor Games, the gymnasium was equipped with a 6-lane 200-meter oval track and a 60-meter straight track, supplied by Mondo. Without the tracks, the field could fit up to 6 tennis courts. The venue was designed to withstand earthquakes up to 5.9 Richter with a life span of 70 years.

Usage
2009 Asian Indoor Games (indoor athletics and closing ceremony)
9th Capital Sports Festival (opening ceremony)
2018 Davis Cup Asia/Oceania Zone Group III
2018 Vietnam National Games (taekwondo and tennis)
2021 Southeast Asian Games (Fencing and closing ceremony)
KCON 2022 (night 3)

After Asian Indoor Games, the tracks were removed and the venue has yet to host another indoor athletics tournament since then. Hanoi Indoor Games Gymnasium has been used mostly for tennis matches, several local sporting events, exhibitions, concerts and other entertainment events.

See also
2009 Asian Indoor Games

References

Indoor arenas in Vietnam
Indoor track and field venues
Athletics (track and field) venues in Vietnam
Sports venues completed in 2009
Sport in Hanoi
Buildings and structures in Hanoi
2009 establishments in Vietnam
Gymnastics venues
2009 Southeast Asian Games